The National Football League playoffs for the 1976 season began on December 18, 1976. The postseason tournament concluded with the Oakland Raiders defeating the Minnesota Vikings in Super Bowl XI, 32–14, on January 9, 1977, at the Rose Bowl in Pasadena, California.

Participants

Bracket

Schedule
Christmas fell on a Saturday in 1976.  In order to avoid scheduling playoff games on the holiday, the regular season opened a week earlier than normal (September 12, the second Sunday of the month, rather than the customary third Sunday) so that the Divisional Playoffs could be held on December 18 and 19 instead of December 25 and 26, and thus no games would be needed on Christmas Day.  The conference championship games were played Sunday, December 26, and Super Bowl XI was played on January 9, the earliest date in Super Bowl history. 

Due to the at-the-time Maryland state law that prohibited Baltimore Colts home games from starting earlier than 2:00 p.m. EST on Sundays, the two divisional playoff games on Sunday, December 19 were pushed to 2:00 p.m. and 5:30 p.m. EST.

In the United States, CBS televised the NFC playoff games, while NBC broadcast the AFC games and Super Bowl XI.

Divisional playoffs

Saturday, December 18, 1976

NFC: Minnesota Vikings 35, Washington Redskins 20

The Vikings jumped to a 35–6 lead by the end of the third quarter, led by running backs Chuck Foreman and Brent McClanahan who each rushed for more than 100 yards.

McClanahan's career-long 41-yard run on Minnesota's first play of the game set up quarterback Fran Tarkenton's 18-yard touchdown pass to tight end Stu Voigt. Eddie Brown gave his team some early scoring opportunities with big special teams plays, first returning the kickoff 26 yards to the 38-yard line, and later returning a punt 17 yards to the Vikings 45.  But the team was unable to capitalize.  All they could do after the kickoff return was go three-and-out, and on the first play after his big punt return, Billy Kilmer threw a pass that was intercepted by Bobby Bryant.  Now momentum seemed slipping away, but on the first play after Bryant's pick, Washington took the ball right back with an interception by safety Jake Scott, who returned it 17 yards to the Minnesota 34-yard line.  Three plays later, Mark Moseley kicked a 47-yard field goal that cut the Washington deficit to 7-3. Later in the quarter, Minnesota drove 66 yards and scored when Tarkenton threw a 27-yard pass to Sammy White.  Safety Ken Houston deflected the ball, but it still bounced to White, who made a diving juggling catch for a touchdown to put the Vikings up 14-3.  By the end of the first quarter, the Vikings had gained 143 yards, while holding Washington to 18 yards and no first downs.

The situation only got worse for Washington in the second quarter.  A promising drive for them into Vikings territory ended with no points when Moseley missed a 51-yard field goal attempt.  Minnesota then drove 66 yards, featuring a 35-yard completion from Tarkenton to Ahmad Rashad, to score on Foreman's 2-yard touchdown run, putting them up 21-3.  The Redskins next drive ended with an interception by Nate Wright.  On the next play, Houston intercepted the ball from Tarkenton and returned it 8 yards to the Vikings 38.  But Minnesota was unable to move the ball and had to punt.  In the final seconds of the half, Washington had a chance for a touchdown with a deep throw from Kilmer to receiver Frank Grant.  Grant had broken open in the end zone, but was unable to make the catch and the pass fell incomplete.

Washington had to punt on the first drive of the second half, and Leonard Willis returned it 10 yards to the Vikings 48, where Minnesota proceeded to drive to a 28-3 lead on a 30-yard touchdown burst by Foreman.  This time the Redskins were able to respond, converting a 20-yard catch by tight end Jean Fugett, a 20-yard run by Mike Thomas, and a 10-yard reception by fullback John Riggins into a 35-yard Moseley field goal, making the score 28-6.  But after this, the Vikings drove 77 yards and scored on a 9-yard pass from Tarkenton to White. By the time Kilmer completed two touchdown passes in the fourth quarter, the game was already out of reach.

This was the second postseason meeting between the Redskins and Vikings, with Minnesota won the only previous meeting.

AFC: Oakland Raiders 24, New England Patriots 21

The Raiders stormed into the 1976 playoffs in dominant form, with an NFL-best 13–1 record.  However, their only loss of the season was to New England, a brutal 48–17 thrashing in week 4.  New England finished the year with an 11–3 record, a spectacular turnaround after going 3–11 the previous season, to make their first playoff appearance since 1963.

The Raiders overcame an 11-point fourth quarter deficit to win on quarterback Ken Stabler's 1-yard touchdown run with 14 seconds left in the game.

Raiders return man Neal Colzie gave his team an early scoring opportunity by returning a New England punt 24 yards to the Pats' 46-yard line.  Oakland was unable to move the ball, and despite a solid Ray Guy punt that pinned the Patriots back at their own 14-yard line, their defense could not stop them from driving 86 yards in 10 plays to take a 7–0 lead on Andy Johnson's 1-yard rushing touchdown.  The key plays of the drive were a spectacular one-handed 48-yard catch by tight end Russ Francis on 3rd down and 7 from the Patriots' 33-yard line, and a 24-yard 3rd-down reception by receiver Darryl Stingley.  On Oakland's next possession, Stabler's completions to Fred Biletnikoff and Cliff Branch for gains of 22 and 17 yards set up Errol Mann's 40-yard field goal, making the score 7–3 with 1:14 left in the first quarter.

The score would not change until near the end of the second quarter, after Oakland defensive back Skip Thomas made a clutch interception in his own red zone from Francis on an option play, and returned it 18 yards to the Raiders' 24.  Oakland subsequently drove 76 yards in 8 plays to score on Stabler's 31-yard touchdown pass to Biletnikoff with 45 seconds left in the half, giving the Raiders a 10–7 halftime lead.

New England regrouped in the second half.  After forcing Oakland to punt on their opening drive, Grogan led the Patriots 80 yards in 9 plays to score on his 26-yard touchdown completion to Francis.  The Raiders had to punt again on their next possession, and New England got the ball with good field position on their own 45, where they drove 55 yards in 10 plays (aided by an offsides penalty on linebacker Ted Hendricks that allowed them to keep possession after a punt play) to go up 21–10 on Jess Phillips' 3-yard rushing touchdown with 1:13 left in the third period.

Oakland responded by driving 70 yards in 8 plays.  Stabler was a perfect 5/5 passing on the drive, including a 17-yard completion to Biletnikoff on the last play of the third quarter, as the team cut their deficit to 21–17 on running back Mark Van Eeghen's 1-yard touchdown run.  After an exchange of punts, New England got the ball on their own 48 with a huge chance to increase their lead or run out the clock to win the game.  After driving to the Raiders' 28, Grogan appeared to pick up a first down on a QB sneak, but it was nullified by an offsides penalty against fullback Sam Cunningham.  Cunningham was then stuffed on a draw during the next play.  Now on 4th down, the Patriots decided to gamble on a 50-yard field goal attempt by John Smith, but his kick was no good, giving the ball back to Oakland with good field position and 4:12 left on the clock.

Stabler then led the Raiders 68 yards for the game-winning score.  Several key completions, including a 12-yard catch by Branch and a 21-yard reception by tight end Dave Casper, gave the team a first down on the Patriots' 28-yard line.  But on the next play, Stabler was sacked for an 8-yard loss by DT Mel Lunsford.  After an incompletion, Oakland faced 3rd and 18 on the 36-yard line.  Stabler threw an incomplete pass on the next play, but it was eliminated by a controversial roughing the passer penalty called by referee Ben Dreith on nose tackle Ray "Sugar Bear" Hamilton, giving Oakland a first down on the Pats' 13 with 57 seconds remaining.  Following a 5-yard catch by Casper and a 4-yard run by Clarence Davis, a personal foul penalty on safety Prentice McCray brought up first and goal at the 1-yard line.  Now with time running out, Stabler faked a handoff to running back Pete Banaszak, who was stuffed at the line of scrimmage, and rolled to the left.  Led by guard Gene Upshaw, Stabler dove into the end zone with 14 seconds left to give the Raiders a 24–21 lead.  Linebacker Monte Johnson then sealed the win with an interception on the last play of the game.

Biletnikoff finished the game with 9 receptions for 137 yards and a touchdown.  Francis had 4 catches for 96 yards and a score.  Stabler completed 19/32 passes for 233 yards and a touchdown, with no interceptions, and scored a rushing touchdown as well.

Penalties played a huge role in the game.  New England had 10 penalties, while the Raiders had 11.  "That was one of the worst-called games I have ever seen in my life," said an angry Patriots DE Julius Adams.  "I just hope they were right", Patriots coach Chuck Fairbanks said about the roughing the passer call against Ray Hamilton on Oakland's game-winning drive. "It looked to me like Ray Hamilton hit the ball first. If he did deflect the ball, it was an incorrect call."  Later on, he added "I'm proud of my team and the way we played today. We’re going home knowing we played our hearts out."

"That's what you say," said Raiders Coach John Madden when the Pats' complaints were brought to his attention by a writer. "If you could sit there for 60 minutes and say the officials turned that game around with penalties at the end, you were wasting your time. You were eating a hot dog somewhere instead of watching what was going on. There was some great football out there."

This was the first postseason meeting between the Patriots and Raiders.

Sunday, December 19, 1976

AFC: Pittsburgh Steelers 40, Baltimore Colts 14

The Steelers, who lost four of their first five games during the season, dominated the Colts with 526 yards of total offense, while limiting Baltimore to only 170. Quarterback Terry Bradshaw completed 14 of 18 passes for 267 yards and three touchdowns, including a 76-yard one to Frank Lewis on the third play of the game, giving him the first perfect 158.3 passer rating in NFL playoff history. Steelers running back Franco Harris racked up 132 rushing yards on 18 carries, and caught 3 passes for 24 yards, despite leaving the game with an injury early in the third quarter.

Lewis' touchdown catch and a 45-yard Roy Gerela field goal gave the Steelers an early 9-0 lead. The Colts made it 9-7 late in the first period with Bert Jones' 17-yard touchdown pass to Roger Carr, but Theo Bell's 60-yard kickoff return set up a 32-yard drive to get the Steelers up 16-7 on Reggie Harrison's 1-yard touchdown run.  Following a punt, they blew a scoring chance when Harrison lost a fumble at the Colts 2-yard line.  But they soon made up for it with two scores in the final minute of the half.  After getting the ball back, Bradshaw put the Steelers ahead 23-7 with a 29-yard touchdown pass to Lynn Swann.  Then Glen Edwards intercepted a pass from Jones and returned it 26 yards to set up a 25-yard Gerela field goal that gave Pittsburgh a 26-7 halftime lead.

In the third quarter, The Colts had an odd drive in which they gained only 36 net yards in 13 plays.  They faced an early 3rd and 6, but a sack on Jones was eliminated by a holding penalty that gave them a first down.  Then Lydell Mitchell appeared to lose a fumble, but officials ruled him down by contact before he lost the ball.  David Lee soon came on to punt, but a roughing the kicker penalty on Larry Brown allowed them to keep the ball again.  The drive finally ended with a turnover on downs at the Steelers 32, and Pittsburgh went on to drive 68 yards in 11 plays, scoring on Bradshaw's 11-yard touchdown pass to Swann.  Now with a 33-7 fourth quarter lead, all that remained would be a touchdown from each team, a 1-yard run by Roosevelt Leaks and a 9-yard score by Harrison.

Less than ten minutes after the conclusion of the game, a small charter plane crashed into the upper deck at Memorial Stadium. There were no deaths or injuries in the accident.

This was the second postseason meeting between the Steelers and Colts. Pittsburgh won last year's meeting.

NFC: Los Angeles Rams 14, Dallas Cowboys 12

The Rams overcame two blocked punts by Dallas to avenge their blowout title game loss to the Cowboys the previous year with a 14–12 win in a defense dominated physical game at Texas Stadium.

Dallas opened the scoring with a 44-yard field goal, but Los Angeles responded with quarterback Pat Haden's 4-yard touchdown run. Late in the first half, Charlie Waters blocked a punt to set up running back Scott Laidlaw's 1-yard touchdown to give the Cowboys a 10–7 lead. Early in the final period, Rams kicker Tom Dempsey made what would have been a game-tying field goal, but Cliff Harris was called for a running into the kicker penalty on the play. The usually conservative Ram coach Chuck Knox uncharacteristically took the points off the board, giving Los Angeles a first down. A few plays later, Lawrence McCutcheon vindicated Knox's decision as he ran for a one-yard touchdown to give the Rams the lead, 14–10. With 1:59 remaining in the game, Waters blocked another punt and the Cowboys recovered the ball at the Los Angeles 17-yard line. On first down, Butch Johnson's reception was ruled incomplete because he could only get one foot down in bounds in the end zone. After two more incompletions, Staubach completed a pass to tight end Billy Joe DuPree at the 8, but he was immediately tackled by safeties Bill Simpson and Dave Elmendorf 1 yard short of the first down marker, causing a turnover on downs. After three "kneel downs" and Cowboy time outs, the Rams faced a 4th and 14 with seconds left in the game. Wary of another blocked punt, Coach Knox ordered Ram punter Rusty Jackson to step out of the back of the end zone for an intentional safety, and the Rams won 14–12.

"We said there was just no way they were getting into the end zone after they blocked that punt," said Simpson (a college teammate of DuPree at Michigan State University) after the game.  We've come through too far and gone through too much.  Staubach went to the wide receivers twice before, and we figured he'd go to DuPree.  We both dove for him the moment Staubach threw.  I think I got a hand on the ball.  We had to play him tough.  Goddamn it was the whole season on one play.  That stuff happened to us too much in the past.  We're going all the way this time."

"Where the official marked the ball wasn't where I caught it", DuPree protested after the game.  "That play was designed to get 10 yards."

The Ram defense held Dallas to only 85 rushing yards; Dallas' defense was equally stingy, allowing 120 rushing yards but the Rams needed 49 attempts to achieve this. Constant Ram pressure caused Staubach to have one of his worst playoff games ever as he was 15 of 37 for 150 yards; he was sacked 4 times and threw 3 interceptions. In addition, Staubach, who had hurt the Rams the year before with his scrambling runs, gained only 8 yards rushing. Ram QB Pat Haden couldn't do much better vs. Dallas' tough defense; he was 10 for 21 for 152 yards and also threw 3 interceptions.

This was the third postseason meeting between the Rams and Cowboys, with Dallas winning both previous meetings.

Conference Championships

Sunday, December 26, 1976

AFC: Oakland Raiders 24, Pittsburgh Steelers 7

Pittsburgh had defeated the Raiders in the AFC championship game in each of the last two seasons.  But with Steelers running backs Franco Harris and Rocky Bleier out of the game with injuries, this time the Raiders easily shut down Pittsburgh's offense.

Late in the first quarter, Bobby Walden's rushed punt went just 19 yards and gave Oakland the ball at the Steelers 38, setting up Errol Mann's 39-yard field goal.  Then in the second quarter, Raiders linebacker Willie Hall intercepted a pass from Terry Bradshaw and returned it 25 yards to the Steelers 1-yard line.  Three plays later,  Clarence Davis' 1-yard touchdown run gave them a 10-0 lead.  Although the game would end up as a defensive struggle with both teams combining for 14 punts (7 each) and only 457 yards (237 for Pittsburgh, 220 for Oakland), Hall's interception would be the only turnover of the day for either team.

The Steelers responded with Bradshaw's completions to Lynn Swann for gains of 18 and 30 yards leading to Reggie Harrison's 3-yard rushing touchdown.  Oakland responded with a methodical 14-play, 69-yard scoring drive. With 19 seconds left in the first half, the Raiders faced first down at the Pittsburgh 4-yard line following a 16-yard burst by Clarence Davis. Oakland lined up three tight ends as if they were to run the ball, but quarterback Ken Stabler threw a play action pass to Warren Bankston for a touchdown to give the Raiders a 17–7 lead at halftime. Oakland controlled the entire second half, including a 12-play, 63-yard drive that featured a 28-yard completion from Stabler to receiver Cliff Branch.  Stabler finished the drive with a 5-yard touchdown pass to Pete Banaszak that put the game out of reach at 24-7.

The Raiders would not host another AFC Title game in Oakland again until 2000 (although they hosted the title game in 1983 when they were the Los Angeles Raiders).

This was the fifth overall postseason meeting between the Steelers and Raiders, with Pittsburgh winning three of the previous four meetings. This is an NFL record for consecutive years to teams have met in the postseason. This was also the last conference championship game contested in December.

NFC: Minnesota Vikings 24, Los Angeles Rams 13

The Vikings forced a blocked field goal, a blocked punt, and two interceptions en route to the victory over the Rams. On offense, running back Chuck Foreman rushed for 118 yards and a touchdown on just 15 carries while also catching 5 passes for 81 yards.

In the first quarter, the Rams got off to a good start as they marched down the field to the Viking 2-yard line. The drive stalled there, and coach Chuck Knox, recalling the NFC championship game in Minnesota two years ago (when the Rams were intercepted in the end zone after driving to the Viking 2-yard line) ordered a field goal attempt. Nate Allen blocked the field goal attempt, and the ball bounced off the ground right into the waiting arms of Bobby Bryant, who returned it 90 yards for a Minnesota touchdown.  The first quarter ended with the Rams dominating the stat sheet.  They had run 22 plays for 89 yards and 7 first downs, while holding the Vikings to 5 plays, one first down, and 17 yards, but they still trailed 7-0.

In the second quarter, linebacker Matt Blair blocked and recovered a punt on the Rams 10-yard line to set up Fred Cox's 25-yard field goal to give the Vikings a 10–0 lead before halftime. Then in the third period, Foreman rushed 62 yards to the Los Angeles 2-yard line, and scored on a 1-yard touchdown run two plays later to increase the lead 17–0.

The Rams rallied back with two quick touchdowns in the third quarter.  After a chance to put the game away was wiped out by Monte Jackson's interception of a Tarkenton pass in the end zone, Pat Haden led the Rams on an 80-yard drive highlighted by a 40-yard pass to Harold Jackson, and culminating in a 10-yard touchdown run by Lawrence McCutcheon.  Rams kicker Tom Dempsey missed the extra point. Dempsey had missed nine extra points during the season.  Announcers Pat Summerall and Tom Brookshier speculated that Haden was feeling pressure on this drive because Knox had James Harris warming up on the sidelines.  On the Vikings' next drive, Fred Dryer hit Fran Tarkenton on a sack, forcing a fumble that was recovered by Jack Youngblood at the Viking 8-yard line. Three plays later, Haden hit Jackson for a 5-yard touchdown pass.

Late in the fourth quarter, the Vikings defense snuffed out two big chances for LA to take the lead.  With 7 minutes left, the Rams drove to a third down on the Vikings 33, but Minnesota linebacker Wally Hilgenberg sacked Haden and forced a punt. With 2:40 left in the game, Los Angeles advanced to the Minnesota 39-yard line. On fourth down and needing more than a field goal, Haden thought he had Jackson open deep near the goal line, but Bryant intercepted the pass (his second of the game) rather than batting it down. A few plays later, Tarkenton dumped a short pass off to Foreman, which he turned into a 57-yard gain.  Foreman was injured on the play, but backup running back Sammy Johnson scored the clinching touchdown from 12 yards out.

This turned out to be the last playoff game at Metropolitan Stadium. The Vikings played four playoff games between 1977 and 1981, all on the road. Minnesota's next home playoff game came after the strike-shortened 1982 season, the Vikings' first in the Hubert H. Humphrey Metrodome.  They would next host an outdoor home playoff game in January 2016.

To date, this is the most recent NFC Championship that the Vikings have won.

This was the third postseason meeting between the Rams and Vikings, with Minnesota winning both previous meetings.

Super Bowl XI: Oakland Raiders 32, Minnesota Vikings 14

This was the first postseason meeting between the Raiders and Vikings.

Trivia
The Patriots-Raiders semifinal matchup was the first AFC playoff game where both contestants were founding members of its predecessor, the AFL.
Their victory in Dallas was the first road playoff win in the history of the Rams franchise.

References

Total Football: The Official Encyclopedia of the National Football League
The Sporting News Complete Super Bowl Book 1995

National Football League playoffs
Playoffs
Los Angeles Rams postseason